Puteri Indonesia 2008 (sometimes called Miss Indonesia Universe 2008) is the 13th edition of Puteri Indonesia beauty pageant. The grand final election was held in the Plenary Hall, Jakarta Convention Center, Jakarta, in the evening of 15 August 2008. The event was sponsored by Charles Bonar Sirait, Choky Sitohang (1st runner-up Puteri Indonesia 2004), Nadia Mulya, and Melanie Putria Dewita Sari (Puteri Indonesia 2002).

Puteri Indonesia 2008 was won by Zivanna Letisha Siregar (DKI Jakarta 6). She represented Indonesia in Miss Universe 2009 where she failed to enter the Top 15. Representatives of Indonesia has not placed on the Top 10 since 1974.  The first runner-up (Puteri Indonesia Environment) is Ayu Diandra Sari Tjakra. She represented Indonesia in Miss International 2009. Second runner-up (Puteri Indonesia Tourism) is Anggi Mahesti. She represented Indonesia in Miss Tourism Queen International 2009.

Results
The Crowns of Puteri Indonesia Title Holders
 Puteri Indonesia 2008 (Miss Universe Indonesia 2008) 
  Puteri Indonesia Lingkungan 2008 (Miss International Indonesia 2008)
 Puteri Indonesia Pariwisata 2008 (Miss Tourism Queen Indonesia 2008)

Contestants 

 Aceh – Shinta Alvionita As
 Bali – Ayu Diandra Sari Tjakra
 Bangka Belitung – Sarah Yunizka
 Banten – Vanessa Ariesca Setrawan
 Bengkulu – Kom Diah Cempaka Sari
 Central Borneo – Veronica Octadewi Taradifa
 Central Celebes – Ayu Wandira
 Central Java – Wima Eka Mutiara
 DKI Jakarta 1 – Ajeng Patria Meilisa
 DKI Jakarta 2 – Alisa Octabiyanti
 DKI Jakarta 3 – Amanda Putri Witdarmono
 DKI Jakarta 4 – Isabelle Laura Lucon
 DKI Jakarta 5 – Merry Halim
 DKI Jakarta 6 – Zivanna Letisha Siregar
 East Borneo – Andina Kamaluddin
 East Java – Yustin Karina
 East Nusa Tenggara – Merlyn Yacoba Kartika Bolla
 Gorontalo – Citra Isramij Pedju
 Jambi – Dewynda Restu Amelya Syarief
 Lampung – Maria Laura Eugenia
 Maluku – Sendyria Leatemia
 North Celebes – Dian Wulan Paramita Suling Murniadi
 North Maluku – Indah Alawiah Pratiwi
 North Sumatra – Raline Rahmat Shah
 Papua – Novita Kristy Krey
 Riau – Citra Ratu Pratama
 Riau Islands – Sarah Devina
 South Borneo – Annisa Shinta Rapika Sari
 South Celebes – Sri Anggun Pratiwi Hiasyah
 South East Celebes – Wa Ode Widya Nita
 South Sumatra – Sylvia Ibrahim Manan
 West Borneo – Hema Kometa Zuriad
 West Celebes – Ni Wayan Ayu Dewi Parwati
 West Java – Astri Megatari
 West Nusa Tenggara – Evhy Apryani
 West Papua – Berka Sawal
 West Sumatra – Emilia Slamat
 Yogyakarta – Anggi Mahesti

References

External links 
 https://web.archive.org/web/20191214192209/http://puteri-indonesia.com/ Official site

2008
2008 in Indonesia
2008 beauty pageants